William Oscar James Robinson (20 March 1909 – 18 October 1968) was a British Labour Party politician.

He was elected at the 1966 general election as Member of Parliament (MP) for Walthamstow East, winning the seat with a majority of 1,807 over the sitting Conservative Party MP John Harvey. He had unsuccessfully contested the same seat at the 1964 general election.   Robinson served only two years in Parliament, dying in office two years later aged 59.

Prior to becoming an MP Robinson had been a solicitor, and had also served as a councillor on two local authorities. He was elected to Leyton Borough Council in 1945, serving until 1952, being elected to Wanstead and Woodford Borough Council in the same year. He also served as Mayor of Wanstead and Woodford in 1962–63.

The resulting by-election was held in March 1969 and won with a 5,479-vote majority by the Conservative Michael McNair-Wilson, whose brother Patrick had won a by-election in 1968.

References

UK General Elections since 1832

External links 

1909 births
1968 deaths
Labour Party (UK) MPs for English constituencies
UK MPs 1966–1970